West of Broadway is a lost 1926 American silent romantic comedy Western film directed by Robert Thornby and starring Priscilla Dean. It was released through Producers Distributing Corporation. The film was based on the short story "New York West" by Wallace Smith and was adapted for the screen by Harold Shumate.

Cast
 Priscilla Dean as 'Freddie' Hayden
 Arnold Gray as Bruce Elwood
 Majel Coleman as Muriel Styles
 Walter Long as Bad Willie
 George M. Hall as Cherokee Charlie
 William Austin as Mortimer Allison

References

External links

 
 
 Lobby poster

1926 films
1926 lost films
1926 romantic comedy films
1920s Western (genre) comedy films
1920s English-language films
American black-and-white films
American romantic comedy films
Films based on short fiction
Films directed by Robert Thornby
Golf films
Lost American films
Lost Western (genre) comedy films
Lost romantic comedy films
Producers Distributing Corporation films
Silent American Western (genre) comedy films
1920s American films
Silent romantic comedy films